Saratov Chernyshevsky State University (СГУ, transcribed as SGU) is a major higher education and research institution in Russia. Named for Nikolay Chernyshevsky, the university was founded in 1909 under the name Imperial Saratov University by the Decree of Emperor Nicholas II. On June 10, 1909, the Emperor signed the "Decree on the foundation of the university in Saratov", which became the tenth University in Russia and consisted of the Medical Faculty only. Professor V.I. Razumovsky became the first university rector. He was a public figure, surgeon, and scientist who is considered to be the founder of a neurosurgery school in Russia. Construction of major university buildings as well as the university clinic named after S.R. Mirotvortsev was carried out under the supervision of the talented Russian architect Karl Hermann Ludwig Müffke. The Regional Institute for Microbiology and Epidemiology in South East Russia opened in the city in 1919.

It is located in  Saratov, a city in the southeast of the European part of Russia, on the right bank of the Volga River. SGU has 28 departments, more than 90 programmes of study are offered and the current enrollment is around 28,000 students. In April 2006 the programming team from Saratov State University won the world finals of the 2006 ACM International Collegiate Programming Contest held in San Antonio, Texas.

Notable people
Isaac Mustafin
Boris Gnedenko
Serafima Gromova
Semyon Belozyorov
Artem Stolyarov

See also 
 List of modern universities in Europe (1801–1945)

References

External links

 Saratov State University's Official Site, English Version
 Saratov State University, brief historical information
 Saratov State University wins World Finals of 2006 ACM Programming Contest, Slashdot, 2006-04-12

 
Buildings and structures in Saratov
Universities in Volga Region
Buildings and structures in Saratov Oblast
National research universities in Russia